National Highway 102 (NH 102) is a short National Highway in India entirely within the state of Manipur.

Images

See also
 List of National Highways in India (by Highway Number)
 List of National Highways in India

References

External links
 NH 102 on OpenStreetMap

AH1
National highways in India
102
Transport in Imphal